The Lemhi County Courthouse, located at 1st Street North and Broadway in Salmon, is the county courthouse of Lemhi County, Idaho. The courthouse was built in 1909–10. Architect W. W. Schultz designed the Classical Revival building, which features four Doric columns made from carved stone in the front and a dentillated cornice broken by a dormer above the entrance. The dormer is topped by a stone statue of Lady Justice made by George Oxham; the statue is the only public sculpture in Idaho which is located atop a courthouse.

The courthouse was added to the National Register of Historic Places on February 7, 1978.

References

Courthouses on the National Register of Historic Places in Idaho
Neoclassical architecture in Idaho
County courthouses in Idaho
Government buildings completed in 1910
Buildings and structures in Lemhi County, Idaho
National Register of Historic Places in Lemhi County, Idaho